T. Parimelazhagan (Dr Parimelazhagan Thangaraj) is currently working as a Professor and Head of the Department of Botany, Bharathiar University, Tamil Nadu. He is known for his expertise in phytomedicine and bioprospecting of medicinal plants. He has committed his research to analyse and isolating various phytocompounds and evaluating the valuable properties of traditional medicinal plants.

Career 
Parimelazhagan completed his graduation (1990–1993) from St. Joseph's College (Autonomous), Trichy and PhD from Bharathiar University under the guidance of Prof. K. Francis, a well known plant physiologist. After, he joined as a Scientist at Defence Research & Development Organization, Ministry of Defence, Ladakh. He has also worked as a Scientist at Rubber Research Institute of India, Ministry of Commerce, Meghalaya. In 2008, he joined Bharathiar University as a Reader to fulfilling his dream of becoming a teacher. He was awarded the prestigious Raman Fellowship for Post-Doctoral Research in 2014 for Indian scholars in the Dept. of Pharmaceutical Sciences, College of Pharmacy University of Hawaii by University Grand Commission, Govt. of India. Added to the credits, he had authored quite a few books and book chapters in his field of specialisation. His innovative research outcomes were converted into patents, and three patents were granted to him. He has more than 110 research publications in international and national peer-reviewed journals.

Awards and recognition 
 Fellow of the Royal Society of Biology, London, U.K.
 Fellow of the Linnean Society (2021), London
 National Science Day Medal 2005 by DRDO, India
 Laboratory Scientist of the Year award 2005 by DRDO, India
 Raman Fellowship by University Grand Commission, Govt. of India

Books coauthored/edited 
 S.K. Dwivedi & T. Parimelazhagan (Eds). 2009. Seabuckthorn Hippophae spp.: The Golden Bush. Satish Serial Publishing House, New Delhi
 T. Parimelazhagan, S.Manian & M.Pugalenthi (Eds). 2011. Herbal perspectives: Present and Future. Satish Serial Publishing House, New Delhi.
 T. Parimelazhagan. 2012. Herbal drug research: Recent Trends and Progress: A research close to nature. LAP LAMBERT Academic Publishing, Germany.
 T. Parimelazhagan (Ed.). 2013. Traditional Herbal Medicine. Pointer Publishers, Jaipur, India.
 T. Parimelazhagan. 2013. Turning Plants into Medicines – Novel Approach. New India Publishing Agency, New Delhi, India
 T. Parimelazhagan. 2013. Scientific Basis of Herbal Medicine. Astral International (P) Ltd, New Delhi, India
 T. Parimelazhagan. 2015. Modern Methods in Phytomedicine. Astral International (P) Ltd, New Delhi. India
 T. Parimelazhagan. 2016. Pharmacological Assays of Plant - Based Natural Products. Springer International Publishing, Switzerland.
 T. Parimelazhagan. 2018. Medicinal Plants: Promising Future for Health and New Drugs. CRC Press, Taylor & Francis Group, Broken Sound Parkway, NW.
 T. Parimelazhagan. 2020. Phytomedicine: Research and Development. CRC Press, Taylor & Francis Group.

References 

Living people
1973 births
Fellows of the Royal Society of Biology
Fellows of the Linnean Society of London
21st-century Indian biologists
20th-century Indian biologists